Börßum is a municipality in the district of Wolfenbüttel, in Lower Saxony, Germany.

Geography
Börßum lies only a few kilometers north of the Harz Mountains, north of Schladen, on the east bank of the Oker, 11 km south of Wolfenbüttel. It is not far southeast of the Oderwald.

Parts of its municipality are Börßum, Achim, Bornum, Kalme and Seinstedt.

History 
Börßum already had a lot of names: 1135 Borsne, 1310 Borssen, 1338 Borssem, 1422 Groß Borsem, 1581 Borsum, 1652 Börsumb, around 1770 Borsheim, 1765 Boersheim, since 1762 Börßum.

On November 1st, 2011 the municipality of Achim was incorporated into Börßum.

Incorporations 

 1 November 2011: Incorporation of the municipality of Achim which included Kalme und Seinstedt
 1 March 1974: Bornum

Religion 
In Börßum there is the Protestant Peter-und-Paul-Kirche, the parish belongs to the parish association Börßum-Achim-Bornum of the provostry Schöppenstedt.

In 1954, the Catholic Curacy of Börßum was founded by the merge of the two parochial vicariates of Hornburg and Semmenstedt. In 1959/60 the Catholic church of St. Bernward was built. In 2011, the church was desecrated, most recently it belonged to the parish of St. Petrus in Wolfenbüttel. Today, the nearest Catholic church is in Heiningen, two kilometres away.

Economy and infrastructure 
Börßum offers a primary school (built 1899, rebuilt 2002/03), a kindergarten, two doctors, a pharmacy, a pub, an optician, restaurants and since 2009 a diner. Furthermore, many sports activities (football, basketball, etc.) are offered.

An Edeka market has been under construction since 2021, which is due to be completed in 2022.

Transport 
Börßum has a passenger stop, which (as of February 2022) is served hourly. Historically, Börßum was also a regionally important railway junction.

References

Wolfenbüttel (district)